Dizzy Doctors is a 1937 short subject directed by Del Lord starring American slapstick comedy team The Three Stooges (Moe Howard, Larry Fine and Curly Howard). It is the 21st entry in the series released by Columbia Pictures starring the comedians, who released 190 shorts for the studio between 1934 and 1959.

Plot
The snoring, layabout Stooges are awakened near midday by their wives, who demand that they find jobs. The boys soon stumble on company president Dr. Bright (Horace Murphy), who is in desperate need of salesmen for his new product called Brighto, which has the tagline "Brighto: makes old bodies new." Thinking the liquid is polish, the Stooges take to the streets where they eagerly demonstrate Brighto for prospective customers, but application of the product damages a policeman's (Bud Jamison) sleeve by Larry, destroys another man's shoe by Moe, and ultimately removes the paint from a man's (Vernon Dent) new car. The angry owner of the car joins with the policeman in hot pursuit of the salesmen.

On the run, the Stooges return to Dr. Bright's office to complain that the polish is so bad they "almost got pinched". Dr. Bright admonishes the Stooges, telling them it is medicine, not polish. However, he still agrees to give them another chance as salesmen. Rejuvenated, the boys work their way into Los Arms Hospital and try to sell Brighto to the patients. Eventually, they enter the superintendent's office to try to make a sale, but the superintendent is the same man whose car's paint job was ruined, and another chase ensues. The Stooges try to escape into an elevator, but the man is inside, so the Stooges close the door on him and send him to the top floor by turning the elevator arrow. The boys then make a hasty exit by riding a hospital gurney into the street, where they use a blanket as a sail. After causing an auto accident, they run home, jump through a window into their bed, and resume sleeping.

Cast

Production notes
Filming of Dizzy Doctors was completed between December 9 and 12, 1936. The footage of the Stooges sailing on a gurney through the city streets would be reused in From Nurse to Worse.

The Stooges try to sell their medicine in the Los Arms Hospital; this is the same hospital seen in Men in Black.

This is the first of three Stooge shorts with the word "dizzy" in the title.

When Moe hits each of the skulls in turn each sounds a different note. The tones are a parody of the G-E-C pattern used for the NBC Chimes.

A colorized version of this film was released in 2006. It was part of the DVD collection entitled "Stooges on the Run".

References

External links

Dizzy Doctors at threestooges.net

1937 films
1937 comedy films
Columbia Pictures short films
American black-and-white films
Films directed by Del Lord
The Three Stooges films
American slapstick comedy films
1930s English-language films
1930s American films